Matovce is a village and municipality in Svidník District in the Prešov Region of north-eastern Slovakia.

History
In historical records the village was first mentioned in 1423.

Geography
The municipality lies at an altitude of 200 metres and covers an area of 3.99 km². It has a population of approximately 131 people.

References

External links
 

Villages and municipalities in Svidník District
Šariš